Aqdash (also Romanized as Āqdāsh) is a village in Sang Sefid Rural District, Qareh Chay District, Khondab County, Markazi Province, Iran. At the 2006 census, its population was 2,535, in 630 families.

References 

Populated places in Khondab County